Japanese ship names follow different conventions from those typical in the West. Merchant ship names often contain the word maru at the end (meaning circle), while warships are never named after people, but rather after objects such as mountains, islands, weather phenomena, or animals.

Merchant ships 

The word  is often attached to Japanese ship names. The first ship known to follow this practice was the Nippon Maru, flagship of daimyō Toyotomi Hideyoshi's 16th century fleet.

Several theories purport to explain this practice:
The most common is that ships were thought of as floating castles, and the word referred to the defensive "circles" or maru that protected the castle. 
The suffix -maru is often applied to words representing something beloved, and sailors applied this suffix to their ships.  
The term maru is used in divination and represents perfection or completeness, or the ship as "a small world of its own".
The myth of Hakudo Maru, a celestial being that came to earth and taught humans how to build ships. It is said that the name maru is attached to a ship to secure celestial protection for itself as it travels.
For the past few centuries, only non-warships bore the -maru ending. Its use was intended as a good hope naming convention that would allow a ship to leave port, travel the world, and return safely to home port: hence the complete circle or "round trip" arriving back at its origin unhurt. 
"Hinomaru", or "sun-disc", is a name often applied to the national flag of Japan.

Today many commercial and private ships are still named using this convention.

Warships

Early conventions 
When the Imperial Japanese Navy was formed, the Ministry of the Navy submitted potential ship names to the Emperor for approval. During the early years ships were often donated by the Shogunate or Japanese clans and the original clan names were kept.

In 1891 the procedure was changed due to changes in the government structure. Two ship names were submitted by the Minister of the Navy to the Lord Chamberlain who then presented the choices to the Emperor. The Emperor could either pick one of the suggested names or one of his own devising.

Ships captured during the First Sino-Japanese War kept their original names but with Japanese pronunciation. For example, the Chinese battleship Chen Yuan became Chin'en in Japanese service.

In 1876 the Minister of the Navy was given the authority to choose the names of torpedo boats without imperial approval. In 1902 the authority to name destroyers was delegated to the Minister of the Navy as well.

In 1895 a proposal was made by the Minister of the Navy in an attempt to establish some standard. He proposed that battleships and cruisers be named for provinces or shrines dedicated to protecting Japan, that names of other warships be selected from the names for Japan or provinces.

Ships captured during the Russo-Japanese War were renamed with Japanese names. Some of these vessels were given names related to where they were captured or some other aspect of the war, such as the month of capture.  Some Russian ships were given Japanese names that were phonetically similar to their original Russian names (example: Angara became Anegawa).

In 1921 the Minister of the Navy was given authority to name all ships except battleships, battlecruisers, and cruisers. In any event the Navy had to report the new name to the Emperor immediately.

Establishment of ship naming conventions 1905 
On 23 April 1905, Naval Minister Gonbee Yamamoto reported to the throne about a new ship naming standard. It was decided on 1 August 1905.

Battleship: provinces, or alternate names of Japan
First class cruiser (and over 7,500 tons displacement): mountains
Second class cruiser (and over 3,500 tons displacement—less than 7,500 tons displacement): put the initial Ni (に)
Third class cruiser (less than 3,500 tons displacement): put the initial Ha (は)
Other ship names: They were named voluntarily by Naval Minister.
However, second class and third class cruisers ended up with river names because it became complicated.

It passed through some changes afterwards, the broad categories of names are given here, with examples, however, if the name is the succession to a ship's name, it is excluded from following contents.

Aircraft carriers—special names (Many of them are an inheritance from the warship name in the Bakumatsu and the Meiji period). In fact, names related to flying animals, actual or mythological, were used.
Fleet aircraft carrier; put the initial Ryū (龍, dragon), Tsuru (Kaku) (鶴, crane) or Ōtori (Hō) (鳳, phoenix) before/after her name
Hōshō (鳳翔) Flying phoenix
Ryūjō (龍驤) Dragon horse
Hiryū (飛龍) Flying dragon
Sōryū (蒼龍) Blue (or green) dragon
Shōkaku (翔鶴) Flying crane
Zuikaku (瑞鶴) Auspicious crane
Taihō (大鳳) Great phoenix
Converted warship; put the initial Ōtori (Hō) (鳳, phoenix) after her name
Zuihō (瑞鳳) Fortunate phoenix
Chitose (千歳) and Chiyoda (千代田) did not change their name by a vote by the crews.
Converted merchant ship; put the initial Taka (Yō) (鷹, falcon/hawk) after her name
 (隼鷹) Peregrine falcon
And after 4 June 1943—added provinces and mountains
Amagi (天城) Mount Amagi
Katsuragi (葛城) Mount Yamato-Katsuragi on prefectural boundary Nara prefecture—Osaka Prefecture
Battleships, including those converted into aircraft carriers—provinces and alternate names for Japan.
Nagato (長門) Nagato province
Yamato (大和) Yamato Province (also an alternate name for Japan and its people)
Kaga (加賀) Kaga Province
Fusō (扶桑) Fusang (another name of Japan)
Battlecruisers and heavy cruisers, including those converted into aircraft carriers—mountains
Kongō (金剛) Mount Kongō, a mountain in Osaka prefecture
Kirishima (霧島) Mount Kirishima, a volcano in Kagoshima prefecture
Akagi (赤城) Mount Akagi, a volcano in the Kantō region
Chōkai (鳥海) Mount Chōkai, a volcano in the Tōhoku region
Light cruisers, including those converted into heavy cruisers—river names
Tone (利根) Tone River, a river in the Kantō region
 (筑摩) Chikuma River, a river in Nagano prefecture
Suzuya (鈴谷) Suzuya River, a river in Karafuto prefecture (now Sakhalin)
Yūbari (夕張) Yūbari River, a river in Hokkaidō
Training cruisers (post-1940)—Shinto shrines
Katori (香取) Katori Shrine
Destroyers
Until 27 August 1912—weather, wind, tide, current, wave, moon, season, other natural phenomenon, plants
And after 28 August 1912
First class destroyers (and over 1,000 tons displacement)—weather, wind, tide, current, wave, moon, season, other natural phenomenon
 (雷) Thunder
Yukikaze (雪風) Snowy wind
Michishio (満潮) High tide
Oyashio (親潮) Oyashio Current
Sazanami (漣) Ripples on the water surface
 (高波) High wave
Mikazuki (三日月) Crescent moon
 (夕雲) Evening cloud
Mutsuki (睦月) January in lunar calendar
 (若葉) Young leaves
 (夕暮) Twilight
 (響) Echo
Second class destroyers (and over 600 tons displacement—less than 1,000 tons displacement)—plants
Nara (楢) Oak
Momi (樅) Abies firma
Sanae (早苗) Rice sprouts
Between 12 October 1921—31 July 1928 under the Eight-eight fleet programme
First class destroyers (Kamikaze class, Mutsuki class and Fubuki class)—Odd numbers from 1 to 27, consecutive numbers and after 28
Destroyer No. 1 (第1駆逐艦), renamed Kamikaze on 1 August 1928
Destroyer No. 46 (第46号駆逐艦), renamed Shikinami on 6 August 1928
Second class destroyers (Wakatake class)—Even numbers from '2' to '26'
Destroyer No. 18 (第18駆逐艦), renamed Karukaya on 1 August 1928
And after 4 June 1943
Type 'A' destroyers—rain, tide
Akisame (秋雨) Autumn rain
Takashio (高潮) High tide
Type 'B' destroyers—wind, moon, cloud, season
Yamazuki (山月) Moon over a mountain
Yukigumo (雪雲) Snow cloud
Hae (南風) South wind of dialect word in Okinawa Prefecture, standard Japanese is Minamikaze
Hayaharu (早春) Early spring
Type 'D' destroyers—plants
Matsu (松) Pine tree
 (梨) Pyrus pyrifolia
Wakakusa (若草) Spring grass
Torpedo boats
Until 15 January 1924
First class torpedo boats (and over 120 tons displacement)—birds
Hayabusa (隼) Peregrine falcon
Second class and third class torpedo boats (less than 120 tons displacement)—consecutive number from '1'
Torpedo boat No. 21 (第21号水雷艇)
And after 30 May 1931—birds
Chidori (千鳥) Plover
Kiji (雉) Pheasant
Submarines
Until 31 October 1924—consecutive number from '1'
Submarine No. 1 (第1潜水艦)
Submarine No. 44 (第44号潜水艦)
And after 1 November 1924
First class submarines (and over 1,000 tons displacement) — 'I' (伊) and consecutive number from '1', 'I' is first letter in the Iroha
I-1 (伊号第1潜水艦) I-Gō Dai-1 sensuikan
I-51 (伊号第51潜水艦) I-Gō Dai-51 sensuikan
Second class submarines (and over 500 tons displacement — less than 1,000 tons displacement) — 'Ro' (呂) and consecutive number from '1', 'Ro' is second letter in the Iroha
Ro-1 (呂号第1潜水艦) Ro-Gō Dai-1 sensuikan
Ro-51 (呂号第51潜水艦) Ro-Gō Dai-51 sensuikan
Third class submarines (less than 500 tons displacement)—'Ha' (波) and consecutive number from '1', 'Ha' is third letter in the Iroha, third class submarines were unified to second class submarines on 30 May 1931
Ha-1 (波号第1潜水艦) Ha-Gō Dai-1 sensuikan
Ha-9 (波号第9潜水艦) Ha-Gō Dai-9 sensuikan
Gunboats—places of scenic beauty and historic interest
Ataka (安宅) Ataka-no-Seki is a barrier station in Kamakura period
Suma (須磨) Suma-no-Ura is beauty spot in Hyōgo Prefecture
Coast defence ship/Escort ships
Until 30 June 1942—Island
Shimushu (占守) Shumshu is one of the Kuril Islands
And after 1 July 1942
Type 'A' and Type 'B' Escort ships—Island
Etorofu (択捉) Iturup
Okinawa (沖縄) Okinawa Island
Type 'C' escort ships—Odd numbers from '1'
Type 'D' escort ships—Even numbers from '2'
Submarine tenders—whales
Jingei (迅鯨) Swift whale
Seaplane tenders—abstract noun, idiomatic word, notable achievement vessels in past war
Chitose (千歳) Long life
Mizuho (瑞穂) another name of Japan, The Land of Vigorous Rice Plants by literal translation
Nisshin (日進) succession to ship name Nisshin
Akitsushima (秋津州) succession to ship name Akitsushima
Minelayers
as warship (fitted imperial seal on bow)—Island, islands, ancient battlefield
Itsukushima (厳島) ancient battlefield of the Battle of Miyajima (Itsukushima Kassen)
Okinoshima (沖島) Okinoshima, and battlefield of the Battle of Tsushima
Yaeyama (八重山) Yaeyama Islands
as mine boat and cable layer—cape, point, island, islet
Sokuten (測天) Sokuten Island is one of the island of the Penghu
Shirakami (白神) Cape Shirakami
as auxiliary minelayer—numbered name
Auxiliary minelayer No. 1 (第1号敷設特務艇)
Netlayers
as warship (fitted imperial seal on bow)
Until 3 June 1943—put the initial Taka (鷹, hawk) after her name
Shirataka (白鷹) White hawk
And after 4 June 1943—birds
Asadori (朝鳥) Birds in morning
as net laying boat—birds
Tsubame (燕) Barn swallow
Auxiliary ships
Collier, oiler, icebreaker, freighter, repair ship, self-propelled target ship, munition ship—cape, point, strait, channel, bay, port
Wakamiya (若宮) Cape Wakamiya; her first classification was transport ship. Cape Wakamiya (Wakamiya-zaki) is in Wakamiya Island, Oki Islands
Akashi (明石) Akashi Strait is water between the Akashi and Awaji Island
Nojima (野島) Cape Nojima in Bōsō Peninsula
Hayasui (速吸) Hayasui-no-Seto is former name of the Hōyo Strait
Ōtomari (大泊) Port of Ōtomari in southern Sakhalin Island
Minesweeper, landing ship, patrol boat, motor torpedo boat, submarine chaser — numbered name
Minesweeper No. 1 (第1号掃海艇)
Landing ship No. 1 (第1号輸送艦)
Patrol boat No. 1 (第1号哨戒艇)
Motor torpedo boat No. 1 (第1号魚雷艇)
Submarine chaser No. 1 (第1号駆潜艇)
Miscellaneous ships
Cargo ship, salvage ship—bridge or station on the arterial road
Komahashi (駒橋) Komahashi-shuku is station on Kōshū Kaidō
Yodohashi (淀橋) Yodohashi bridge on Ōme Kaidō
Repair ship—strait, isthmus
Hayase (早瀬) Hayase-no-Seto is water between the Kurahashi Island and Higashi-Nōmi Island
Hitonose (飛渡瀬) Hitonose is isthmus between the Etajima and Nōmi Island
And over 600-ton Salvage ship and tugboat, and after 22 January 1937—associated name of the naval base (anchorage name, place name, island)
Tategami (立神) Tategami anchorage in the Sasebo Naval Base
Hashima (波島) Hashima Island is small island in the Yokosuka Naval Base
Other miscellaneous ships—numbered name

Post–World War II
Prior to the end of World War II Japanese ship names were rendered in kanji; after the end of the war this tradition was abandoned in favor of hiragana to separate the perception of the Maritime Self-Defense Forces from the old navy.

Helicopter destroyers and Helicopter carriers (DDH)—traditional provinces and mountains
Guided missile destroyers (DDG)—mountains and weather terms
Small destroyers (DD)—weather terms
Frigates (DE)(FFM)—rivers
Submarines (SS)—ocean currents and legendary auspicious animals
Replenishment oilers (AOE)—lakes
Amphibious transport docks and troopships (LST)—peninsulas

Translated names 
The English translations of the Japanese warships provide names; the literal translation of the  characters does not necessarily represent how the name is perceived to the Japanese. For example, Akagi is probably perceived as "red castle" by Japanese about as often as Philadelphia is perceived as the "city of brotherly love" by Americans.

There is a tendency for translations of Japanese names to be somewhat fanciful. For example, Shōkaku is often translated as "crane flying in heaven", but "flying crane" or "soaring crane" is a more accurate translation. Another fanciful translation is "land of divine mulberry trees" for Fusō—fuso was a Chinese name for a mythical tree supposed to grow to the east, hence an old poetic word for Japan.

In World War II, the composition of the Japanese Navy was a military secret. US Naval Intelligence built up knowledge of enemy ships through photographic reconnaissance, interrogation of prisoners, and signal interception. Inevitably there were mistakes and misinterpretations; some of these have been repeated in post-war accounts that rely on US Navy documents. For example, a prisoner of war after the battle of Midway reported the existence of an aircraft carrier named Hayataka. This was a misreading of the characters 隼鷹 in kun-yomi, while they in this case are properly read in on-yomi as Jun'yō. Accordingly, many US documents refer to the carrier as Hayataka or its class as the Hayataka class. In another example, when Joseph F. Enright claimed the sinking of the Japanese Aircraft Carrier Shinano, US naval intelligence was originally only willing to credit him with sinking a cruiser; this was in part because they believed the name "Shinano" (derived from intercepted Japanese transmissions) referred to the Shinano River (thereby denoting a cruiser), when in fact the name referred to the Shinano province of Japan.

References

 Interrogation of Japanese Prisoners taken after Midway Action

Bibliography 
Monthly Ships of the World,  (Japan)
No. 441, Special issue Vol. 32, "Japanese cruisers", September 1991
No. 453, Special issue Vol. 34, "History of Japanese destroyers", July 1992
No. 469, Special issue Vol. 37, "History of Japanese submarines", August 1993
No. 507, Special issue Vol. 45, "Escort Vessels of the Imperial Japanese Navy", February 1996
No. 522, Special issue Vol. 47, "Auxiliary Vessels of the Imperial Japanese Navy", March 1997
Daiji Katagiri, Kōjinsha (Japan), June 1988, 
Masahide Asai, Tōkyō Suikōsha (fringe organization of the Ministry of the Navy), December 1928
Motoyoshi Hori, Hara Shobō (Japan), June 1987, 
Shizuo Fukui, Stories of the Japanese aircraft carriers, Kojinsha, Japan, 1996, .
1/700 Water Line Series Guide book of Imperial Japanese Navy ships, Shizuoka Plastic Model Manufacturers Association (Aoshima Bunka Kyozai/Tamiya Corporation/Hasegawa Corporation), October 2007
, National Archives of Japan
Reference code: C05110830400, [Data in English is under preparation] 官房３０６号 １２．１．２２ 雑役船の公称番号及船種変更の件.
Reference code: C13071953800, [Data in English is under preparation] 第１３類　艦船（４）.

Naming conventions
Ship naming conventions
Japanese designation systems